Tommy Brann (born December 23, 1951) is an American politician from Michigan. Brann is a Republican member of Michigan House of Representatives from District 77.

Early life 
Thomas Michael Brann was born on December 23, 1951. Brann's father is John Brann, a former restaurateur. He graduated from East Grand Rapids High School.

Career 
Brann is the owner of Brann's Steakhouse and Grille. At 19, Brann started his first restaurant business. Brann is the author of Mind Your Own Business. After Michael Moore and Seth Rogen criticized the film American Sniper, Brann banned the two from visiting his restaurants, describing their criticism as "hateful" against the United States Armed Forces and military sniper Chris Kyle, who was portrayed in the film.

Political career 
On November 6, 2016, Brann won the election and became a Republican member of Michigan House of Representatives for District 77. Brann defeated Dana Knight. In 2018 and 2020, as an incumbent, Brann won the reelection served House District 77.

On October 10, 2021, Brann co-sponsored House Bill 5444 also known as the "fetal heartbeat protection act."

Brann disagreed with U.S. Representative Peter Meijer approving of the second impeachment of Donald Trump, though supported Meijer during the  District 3 House of Representatives elections in 2022. In the 2022 Michigan Senate election, Brann was defeated by Winnie Brinks in a race form representing Michigan's 29th Senate district.

Personal life 
Brann is married to Sue Brann and they live in Wyoming, Michigan.

See also 
 2016 Michigan House of Representatives election
 2018 Michigan House of Representatives election

References

External links 
 Tommy Brann at ballotpedia.org
 Grand Rapids Chamber Podcast (Season 2, Episode 8: Representative Tommy Brann)
 Tommy Brann at  wktvjournal.org

21st-century American politicians
Republican Party members of the Michigan House of Representatives
Candidates in the 2021 United States elections
Living people
1953 births